Teslo can refer to:

Teslo, a character from the Mixels franchise
Terje Teslo, the mayor of Eidsvoll, a community in Norway